Daurentius, Dauritas, or Dobreta was a South Slavic (Sclaveni) chieftain. He seems to have been the supreme chief, having lesser ones subordinated to him. His realm was situated in the basin of the Zala river, roughly in the territory of the old Roman province of Pannonia Prima, in present-day Hungary.

Daurentius is the first Slavic chieftain to be recorded by name, by the Byzantine historian Menander Protector, who reported that the Avar khagan Bayan I sent an embassy, asking Daurentius and his Slavs to accept Avar suzerainty and pay tribute, because the Avars knew that the Slavs had amassed great wealth after repeatedly plundering the Byzantine Balkan provinces. Daurentius reportedly retorted that "Others do not conquer our land, we conquer theirs [...] so it shall always be for us", and had the envoys slain. Bayan then campaigned (in 578) against Daurentius' people, with aid from the Byzantines, and set fire to many of their settlements, although this did not stop the Slavic raids deep into the Byzantine Empire.

Legacy
K. Nikolaevič (1862) mentioned Daurentius, "the then king or grand prince of the Slavs", with the name Dobreta, which he rendered via the Greek pronunciation of β=ν.

References

Sources

 
 bibliography entry 
 

South Slavic history
6th-century Slavs
6th-century rulers in Europe
6th century in Hungary
Slavic warriors